Lexington Township is an inactive township in Lafayette County, in the U.S. state of Missouri.

Lexington Township was established in 1824, taking its name from the community of Lexington, Missouri.

References

Townships in Missouri
Townships in Lafayette County, Missouri